This is a list of theatrical animated cartoon shorts distributed by Metro-Goldwyn-Mayer which were not part of any other series such as Tom and Jerry, Droopy, Barney Bear, Screwy Squirrel, George and Junior, Spike and Tyke, Spike or Happy Harmonies. All the cartoons were produced in Technicolor.

1930s

1940s

1950s

1960s

References

MGM
 
MGM
Lists of animated short films